Garnahovit is a village in the Talin Municipality of the Aragatsotn Province of Armenia. The village has an imposing mid-7th century church of S. Gevorg. There are other church remains in the gorge to the east and Urartian remains nearby to the east and southeast.

References 

Report of the results of the 2001 Armenian Census

Populated places in Aragatsotn Province